Mario Verdial Alsina (2 May 1962 – 5 February 2015) was a Honduran businessman who since 2001 served as co-chairman of the football club Real C.D. España as well as Vice-President of the National Autonomous Federation of Football of Honduras.

On 5 February 2015 Verdial, one of his bodyguards and a taxi driver were killed by unknown men on an ambush in Villanueva, Cortés.

References

1962 births
2015 deaths
People from San Pedro Sula
Honduran businesspeople
Deaths by firearm in Honduras
Honduran murder victims